Following is the list of educational institutions in Rudrapur, Uttarakhand.

Schools

Institutes

References

High schools and secondary schools in Uttarakhand
Rudrapur, Uttarakhand